Gabe Gala (born June 29, 1989 as Gala Gabriel Gala) is a Canadian soccer player.

Career

Youth
Gala moved from his native Nigeria to Brampton, Ontario as a young child. He played club soccer for the Brampton East SC and North Mississauga SC and his high school C. W. Jefferys.

Professional
Gala joined Toronto FC as a development player in 2007, and played extensively in the MLS Reserve Division prior to him making his professional debut on June 2, 2007, when he came on as a substitute against the Colorado Rapids. He scored his first goal for the Toronto FC first-team in an international friendly against Real Madrid on August 7, 2009. After making 15 appearances for Toronto in the 2010 season he was waived by the club on November 24 following the 2010 MLS Expansion Draft. He also attended the University of Toronto and played for the Varsity Blues during this time.

In 2011, he signed with newly expansion Mississauga Eagles FC of the Canadian Soccer League. He took two years of a sabbatical from soccer, and later returned in 2014 to sign with North York Astros. During his tenure with North York he helped the club secure a postseason berth by finishing fourth in the postseason. After the departure of North York from the CSL he signed with expansion franchise Scarborough SC.

In 2016, he joined League1 Ontario club North Mississauga SC.

International
Gala made his debut for the Canada's U-20 team on May 19, 2006 against Brazil, and made his first start against the United States on July 9, 2006. He was also a member of Canada's U20 side for the 2007 U20 World Cup.

Club statistics

Honours

Toronto FC
Canadian Championship (1): 2010

References

External links

1989 births
Living people
People from Adamawa State
Black Canadian soccer players
Canadian Soccer League (1998–present) players
Canadian soccer players
Naturalized citizens of Canada
Canadian sportspeople of Nigerian descent
Nigerian footballers
Nigerian emigrants to Canada
Toronto FC players
Major League Soccer players
Canadian real estate agents
Canada men's youth international soccer players
Mississauga Eagles FC players
North York Astros players
Scarborough SC players
Association football midfielders
North Mississauga SC players
Toronto Varsity Blues soccer players
Soccer players from Brampton